Bernard Eugene Reilly (February 7, 1884 – November 15, 1934) was a second baseman in Major League Baseball. He played for the Chicago White Sox in 1909.

References

External links

1884 births
1934 deaths
Major League Baseball second basemen
Chicago White Sox players
Haverhill Hustlers players
St. Joseph Drummers players
Baseball players from Massachusetts
Sportspeople from Brockton, Massachusetts